The Guadiana International Bridge is a bridge that crosses the Guadiana River connecting southern Spain (town of Ayamonte) and Portugal (town of Castro Marim). It is the southernmost land crossing on the Portugal–Spain border. It is not split evenly between the two countries, a greater share of it situated in Portugal. Completed in 1991, its structural type is a cable-stayed bridge, with a deck of prestressed concrete. The bridge was designed by the Portuguese Structural Engineer Professor José Luis Câncio Martins on behalf of Huarte S.A. (now Obrascón Huarte Lain) and Teixeira Duarte. The bridge is open to vehicles only. It is the third longest bridge in Portugal and one of the longest in Spain.

The bridge is 666 metres long with the central span between the towers being 324 metres. The deck stands 20 metres above the river, allowing the navigation of ships of deep draft. The two towers of the bridge are 95 and 96 metres tall, respectively. The Spanish side tower rests on an artificial island built on the riverbed, while the pillar on the Portuguese side is on land.

The bridge connects the Via do Infante de Sagres A22 motorway (Portugal) to the Autopista del Quinto Centenario A-49 Motorway (Spain), and is part of the European route E1.

History

In the 1960s Portugal and Spain conducted studies to determine if a bridge in the area was possible. These began in 1963 and ended in 1985 with the signing of an agreement between the two countries.

See also
 Guadiana Roman bridge.
 Lower Guadiana International bridge.
 Our Lady of Help Bridge.

References

External links
 

International bridges
Road bridges in Spain
Bridges in Andalusia
Cable-stayed bridges in Portugal
Bridges completed in 1991
Portugal–Spain border crossings
Cable-stayed bridges in Spain
Bridges over the Guadiana River
1991 establishments in Europe